The Pegaso Z-102 is a Spanish sports car produced by Pegaso in Spain in both coupé and cabriolet form from 1951 until 1958.

Background
Pegaso was an established company noted for its trucks and motor coaches, but also produced sports cars for seven years. Pegaso's chief technical manager was Wifredo Ricart who formerly worked as chief engineer for Alfa Romeo, and while there designed the Alfa Romeo Tipo 512. The Z-102 started life as a pair of prototypes in 1951 with coupe and drophead body styles. Both prototypes had steel bodies which were determined to be too heavy and Pegaso made the decision to switch to alloy bodies to save weight. However, the cars were still quite heavy and brutish to drive and racing success was virtually nonexistent. Because the cars were built on a cost-no-object basis the car soon proved too costly to warrant continued production and the Z-102 was discontinued after 1958. A simplified and cheaper version, the Z-103 with 3.9, 4.5 and 4.7 litre engines, was put into production but had little success and only 3 were built.

Production 
Pegaso made the Z-102 starting in 1951 and finishing in 1958 having built a total of 84 cars (some sources  say only 71). Out of those 84, 28 were cabriolets while the rest were fixed roof coupés. The original design for the Z-102 was penned by Pegaso chief technical manager Wifredo Ricart, formerly chief engineer for Alfa Romeo. The majority of Z-102s had bodies by Carrozzeria Touring (although early Z-102 units carry Pegaso-made bodies), but a handful of cars had bodies by other coachbuilders. Carrozzeria Touring's design built on Ricart's original design, with changes including redesigning the grille, lowering the car, re-positioning the fog lights and simplifying various details to give it a cleaner profile. This body style is the most well known and numerous of the Z-102 bodies. French coachbuilder Saoutchik bodied 18 cars, 3 of which were convertibles, as well as one of the original prototypes. Coachbuilder Serra bodied a handful of cars as well. In house coachbuilder Enasa also built a version of the Z-102 called the "Cupola" which was designed based on sketches from Spanish students. The students were given the challenge of sketching what they thought cars of the future would look like. Prominent design cues from those drawings were then taken, and Enasa brought the car to life. Only two "Cupola" models were known to have been built. One of the two was purchased by Dominican dictator Rafael Trujillo. Only one of the Cupola models is known to have survived and it is currently owned by the Louwman Museum.

Performance
The Z-102 had a pressed steel chassis with an alloy body. Everything was produced in-house at Barcelona at Pegaso's own factory, with the exception of coachwork. The Z-102 is powered by a four-cam all-alloy V8 engine featuring dry-sump lubrication. Power went through a 5-speed non-synchromesh transaxle.

The Z102 entered production with a 2.5 (2,472 cc) litre engine, as was used in the prototypes, though later variants used a 2.8 L (2,816 cc), and 3.2 L (3,178 cc) litre DOHC desmodromic 32-valve V8  engines with multiple carburetors or an optional supercharger. The base model Z-102 had a top speed of 120 mph (192 km/h).

The main beams of the car's frame had large lightening holes, and the wheel wells under the body were used as stressed members.

This rear-wheel-drive car had its transmission in the rear, connected to the differential (making it a transaxle). But it was unusually located behind the differential within a reverse A-frame whose apex was at the rear of the chassis. A fuel tank was situated on each side of the transmission.

The rear suspension was De Dion, with the unusual feature that to restrain the tube from side-to-side movement, its tube had a small wheel at its midpoint that rolled in a vertical channel on the front of the differential (which in a De Dion system is bolted to the chassis) instead of using a Watt's linkage or a Panhard rod.

Racing 

Z-102s competed in several racing events but were met with little to no real success. Two z-102 were entered for the 1952 Monaco Grand Prix for drivers Juan Jover and Joaquin Palacios, one right hand and one left hand drive, (plus a third left hand drive spare car). He sustained serious injuries to his left leg from the crash, and Pegaso decided to withdraw their other cars. They competed also in the 1954 Carrera Panamericana, driven by Joaquin Palacio, achieving promising results in the first stages, but an accident prevented an excellent final position.On September 25, 1953, in Jabbeke (Belgium), a Z-102 Touring BS/2.8 (the old Barchetta used at Le Mans, 2.8 litre single supercharger), driven by Celso Fernández, broke four official R.A.C.B. (Royal Automobile Club de Belgique) world records. Of these records the most prominent was its speed in the flying-start kilometer. The supercharged Z-102 achieved a 243.079 km/h (151.042 mph) average, a record previously held by a Jaguar XK120. This made the Z-102 the fastest production car in the world at that time. The original Z-102 BSS/2.5 Bisiluro Especial Competición (2.5 litre twin supercharged) built to take on the records couldn't be used because of a blown engine.

Concours events 

A Pegaso Z-102 coupé with coachwork by Saoutchik, owned by Baron Thyssen-Bornemisza, wearing leopard skin upholstered seats and gold controls won the 1953 Enghien-les-Bains (France) Grand Prix d'Elegance. A 1952 Z-102 "Cupola", one of two believed to have been made and the only one known to have survived, took the Chairman's Choice Award and Best of Show Concours de Sport at the 2016 Amelia Island Concours d'Elegance.

Technical data
Note: Technical data is for the 2.8-liter Z102 produced in 1953.

See also
Production car speed record
Timeline of most powerful production cars

References

External links
Automobile-Catalog Full line of Pegaso Z-102
CanadianDriver Motoring Memories: Pegaso
"Memory of a mirage" exhibition, 2001
Jabbeke records fiftieth anniversary celebration (in Spanish)
Pegaso Z-102 Saoutchik cabriolet
PIEL DE TORO (in Spanish)

Grand tourers
Rear-wheel-drive vehicles
Convertibles
Coupés
Cars of Spain
Cars introduced in 1951